Tülay  is a common feminine Turkish given name. In Turkish, "Tülay" may be used to express "Delicate as a tulle" and "Bright like the moon". However, as Given Name it means "tulle moon" a combination of both the previous meanings.

People
 Tülay German (born 1935), Turkish pop folk singer
 Tülay Keçialan (born 1965), Turkish pop singer, better known as Asya
 Tülay Tuğcu (born 1942), Turkish high-ranked judge

Turkish feminine given names